Chaoyangmen Station can refer to:

 Chaoyangmen station (Beijing Subway), a metro station in Beijing, China
 Chaoyangmen station (Xi'an Metro), a metro station in Xi'an, China